Vahid Mohammadzadeh (born 16 May 1989) is an Iranian professional footballer who plays for Aluminium Arak in the Iran Pro League.

Club career

Mes Rafsanjan
Mohammadzadeh started his career with Mes Rafsanjan in the Azadegan League. He was one of the most successful players in the team, and managed to score one goal as a defender.

Saipa
In the summer of 2014 Vahid signed a three-year contract to Iran Pro League side Saipa. He made his debut match against Esteghlal on 19 August 2014. In a game against Gostaresh Foolad on 29 January, Vahid was named player of the match after scoring two goals as a defender. The game finished 3-2 on Saipa's side.

Zob Ahan
In the winter of 2016 Mohammadzadeh signed a two and half year contract to Iran Pro League side Zob Ahan. On 5 April 2016 Vahid scored the second goal from a corner  in a 5–2 victory over Bunyodkor in the AFC Champions League.

Club career statistics

Honours
Zob Ahan
Hazfi Cup (1): 2015–16
Iranian Super Cup (1): 2016

References

External links

 
 
 
 
 
 Vahid Mohammadzadeh at the-afc.com
  

1989 births
Living people
Iranian footballers
Saipa F.C. players
Zob Ahan Esfahan F.C. players
People from Alborz Province
Association football central defenders